David Winter may refer to:
David A. Winter (1930–2012), Canadian kinesiologist
David Alexandre Winter (born 1943), Dutch-born pop singer
David Winter, character in 2007 American horror film The Reaping
David Winter (sculptor), English miniature building sculptor
David Winter (actor), German actor

See also
David Winters (disambiguation)